Hanbin may refer to:
 
Hanbin District, a district in Ankang, Shaanxi, China
Hanbin Township, a township in Yining, Ili Kazakh Autonomous Prefecture, Xinjiang, China
Wang Hanbin (born 1925), Chinese Communist Party politician
He Hanbin (born 1986), Chinese badminton player
Hanbin Ng (born 1989), Singaporean basketball player
B.I (rapper) (Kim Han-bin; born 1996), South Korean rapper
Hanbin (Ngô Ngọc Hưng; born 1998), member of the South Korean boy group Tempest formed by Yuehua Entertainment

See also
Han-bin, a Korean given name, sometimes transliterated Hanbin